San Narciso (Spanish for "Saint Narcissus") is the name of two places in the Philippines:

San Narciso, Quezon
San Narciso, Zambales

In other uses
 San Narciso, Belize
 San Narciso, a fictional Californian city in Thomas Pynchon's The Crying of Lot 49
 1867 San Narciso Hurricane, the costliest and deadliest storm of the 1867 Atlantic hurricane season